Daniel Niklas Bång (born 19 April 1987) is a Swedish former professional ice hockey Right wing. He played 8 NHL games with the Nashville Predators but spend most of the 2012/13 season with their American Hockey League (AHL) affiliate the Milwaukee Admirals. He played as a youth with Kista HC and AIK.

Bång has previously played for AIK of the Swedish top-tier league Elitserien (SEL). He signed a one-year, two-way contract with the Nashville Predators of the National Hockey League (NHL) worth $0.7 million USD on 1 June 2012.

After signing a 1-year contract with Lausanne HC of the Swiss National League A (NLA) he signed a 2-year extension in January 2014. He was part of the LHC team who qualified for the playoffs for the first time in the club's history on 4 March 2014. They went on to push the top seed ZSC Lions to a seventh game that they lost 1–0 in Zurich.

Career statistics

Regular season and playoffs

References

External links

1987 births
Living people
AIK IF players
Lausanne HC players
Milwaukee Admirals players
Nashville Predators players
Ice hockey people from Stockholm
Swedish ice hockey right wingers
Undrafted National Hockey League players